Heyheads is the easternmost area of Stalybridge, in Greater Manchester, England. The area includes the sixteenth century Grade II listed Nos 1, 2 and 3 Moorgate Farmhouse and  adjoining barn and shippon buildings. Boundary cottages mark the boundary between Stalybridge and Mossley and the historic boundary between Cheshire and Lancashire. Modern Housing was built on Huddersfield Road in the 1970. With a further estate built close to Moorgate in the 1990s.

The view to the south is dominated by the steep-sided Buckton Hill, on the summit of which is located Buckton Castle.
Stamford Golf Club has an 18-hole course to the North of Huddersfield Road. The club was incorporated on Saturday 24 August 1901 and like the only pub in Heyheads, The Stamford Arms, was named after the local Landowner the Earl of Stamford.

External links
 Tameside Local History Forum

Areas of Greater Manchester
Geography of Tameside